Evgeny Gennadyevich Pechonkin (born October 9, 1973 in Krasnodar) is a Russian bobsledder and former track and field athlete who has switched to his current sport in 2005. As a sprint hurdler, he represented Russia at the Olympic Games in 1996, 2000 and 2004. He was the world junior champion in 1992 and competed at the World Championships in Athletics in 1993 and 2001.

His best Bobsleigh World Cup finish was second in the four-man event at Cortina d'Ampezzo in January 2008. Pechonkin's best finish at the FIBT World Championships was tenth in the four-man event at Altenberg in 2008. 

He was banned from athletics for two years after failing a doping test in 2002 for the banned substance norandrosterone. This resulted in the annulling of his Russian national indoor title that year and a bronze medal at the 2002 European Athletics Indoor Championships.

He was previously married to former hurdler Yuliya Pechonkina.

See also
List of doping cases in athletics

References

 FIBT profile
 
 

1973 births
Living people
Russian male bobsledders
Russian male hurdlers
Olympic male hurdlers
Olympic athletes of Russia
Athletes (track and field) at the 1996 Summer Olympics
Athletes (track and field) at the 2000 Summer Olympics
Athletes (track and field) at the 2004 Summer Olympics
World Athletics Championships athletes for Russia
World Athletics U20 Championships winners
Russian Athletics Championships winners
Doping cases in athletics
Russian sportspeople in doping cases